Egland Haxho (also spelled Eglant, born 10 November 1988 in Tiranë) is an Albanian football player who plays as a goalkeeper for FC Prishtina in the Football Superleague of Kosovo.

Club career
He joined newly promoted Albanian Superliga side Tërbuni Pukë ahead of the club's debut season in the top flight.

References

External links
 
 
 
 

1988 births
Living people
Footballers from Tirana
Albanian footballers
Association football goalkeepers
Albania under-21 international footballers
Kategoria Superiore players
Kategoria e Parë players
Football Superleague of Kosovo players
KF Apolonia Fier players
FC Kamza players
FK Tomori Berat players
KF Bylis Ballsh players
FK Kukësi players
KF Butrinti players
KF Tërbuni Pukë players
FK Renova players
FK Partizani Tirana players
KF Llapi players
FC Prishtina players
Albanian expatriate footballers
Expatriate footballers in North Macedonia
Albanian expatriate sportspeople in North Macedonia
Expatriate footballers in Kosovo
Albanian expatriate sportspeople in Kosovo